22 teams took part in the league with FC Dynamo Kyiv winning the championship (the first Soviet champion from outside Moscow).

Round 1

Group A

Table

Results

Group B

Table

Results

Round 2

Places 1–10

Table

Results

Places 11–22

Table

Results

Top scorers
22 goals
 Gennadi Gusarov (Torpedo Moscow)

20 goals
 Gennadi Krasnitsky (Pakhtakor Tashkent)
 Viktor Voroshilov (Lokomotiv Moscow)

18 goals
 Viktor Kanevskyi (Dynamo Kyiv)
 Aleksei Mamykin (CSKA Moscow)

15 goals
 Igor Chislenko (Dynamo Moscow)
 Sergey Kvochkin (Kairat Alma-Ata)

14 goals
 Zaur Kaloyev (Dinamo Tbilisi)
 Galimzyan Khusainov (Spartak Moscow)
 Yuri Zakharov (Shakhtyor Stalino)

Promotion/relegation Tournament

References

 Soviet Union - List of final tables (RSSSF)

Soviet Top League seasons
1
Soviet
Soviet